Mohamed Boucha (1966 – 24 June 2021) was a Nigerien politician.

Biography 
Boucha attended secondary school in Agadez, where he graduated in 1985. He earned a master's degree in management from the University of Ouagadougou in 2011.

Boucha worked as an accountant and trainer for the Niger Armed Forces from 1987 to 2002. He then started his own accounting business in Agadez. From 2003 to 2007, he worked for the United Nations Development Programme, where he was a branch manager for the integration of former paramilitary fighters in northern Niger. From 2012 to 2013, he worked for the United States Agency for International Development as a coordinator responsible for the Agadez region.

Boucha began his political career as a member of the National Movement for the Development of Society (MNSD-Nassara), for which he stood in the 2011 election as a substitute for Hamed Haïdara Ag Elgafiat in the Agadez region. He served in several roles in the government of President Mahamadou Issoufou and Prime Minister Brigi Rafini. On 13 August 2013, he became Minister Delegate for the Budget. On 4 June 2015, he was assigned to advise Minister for Economic Affairs and Finance . That year, he joined the Patriotic Movement for the Republic (MPR-Jamhuriya), led by Albadé Abouba.

On 11 April 2016, Boucha was appointed Deputy Minister of Agriculture for Livestock under Albadé Abouba. In 2020, he co-founded the  alongside , for which he first served as treasurer. The rise of the party led to a dispute between Boucha and Abouba, rendering progress between the two impossible.

Following the death of Minister of Employment, Labor and Social Protection Mohamed Ben Omar, Boucha succeeded him. Ali Gonki of the Social Democratic Party succeeded him as Deputy Minister for Livestock. On 4 December 2020, Boucha also became interim Minister of Post, Telecommunications and E-Business following the departure of fellow party member Sani Maïgochi to run for the National Assembly.

Boucha left the government on 7 April 2021. On 10 May 2021, President Mohamed Bazoum appointed Boucha to be his special advisor.

Mohamed Boucha died in Niamey on 24 June 2021 following a brief illness.

References 

1966 births
2021 deaths
Nigerien political people
Ministers of council of Niger
21st-century Nigerien politicians
National Movement for the Development of Society politicians
Patriotic Movement for the Republic politicians
University of Ouagadougou alumni
People from Agadez Region
 accountants